Rio Douro may refer to:

Places
 Rio Douro, the Portuguese name for the River Douro
 Rio Douro (Cabeceiras de Basto), a civil parish in the municipality of Cabeceiras de Basto